Lesina may refer to:

Places and jurisdictions

Croatia
 Hvar, an island in Split–Dalmatia County, also known as Lesina in Italian and English
 Hvar (city), the largest city on the island

Italy
 Lesina, Apulia, a comune in the Province of Foggia
 Roman Catholic Diocese of Lesina, now a Latin titular see
 Lake Lesina, a lake in the Province of Foggia, Apulia
 Foggia Airfield Complex, a military airfield in the Province of Foggia of which Lesina airfield was a part

Other
 Lesina (insect), an insect genus in the tribe Agraeciini